The Future Vision of the Palestinian Arabs in Israel is a joint document put together by prominent Arab citizens of Israel in December 2006, that calls for the state of Israel to shed its Jewish identity and become "a state of all its citizens". The document caused a great deal of controversy, even among more liberal Jewish Israelis.

References

External links
 Contents of the report
 Jews and Arabs: In view of the vision documents by Israel’s Arabs, Eretz Acheret Magazine

Ethnic minorities
Society of the State of Palestine
2006 in Israel
2006 documents
Anti-Zionism in Israel